Sanchai Ratiwatana and Sonchat Ratiwatana won the first edition of this tournament, defeating Fritz Wolmarans and Michael Yani 7–6(7–4), 6–3 in the final.

Seeds

Draw

Draw

References
 Main Draw

Shanghai Challenger - Doubles
2011 Doubles